Cobra Verde is the sixteenth album by Popol Vuh. It was originally released in 1987 on Milan Records as the original motion picture soundtrack of Werner Herzog's Cobra Verde with Klaus Kinski. In 2006 SPV re-released the album with one bonus track (recorded during the sessions for the 1991 Popol Vuh album For You and Me).

Track listing 
All tracks composed by Florian Fricke except where noted.

 "Der Tod des Cobra Verde" – 4:35
 "Nachts: Schnee" – 1:51
 "Der Marktplatz" – 2:30
 "Eine andere Welt" – 5:07
 "Grab der Mutter" – 4:30
 "Die singenden Mädchen von Ho, Ziavi" (Zigi Cultural Troupe Ho, Ziavi) – 6:52
 "Sieh nicht überm Meer ist's" – 1:26
 "Hab Mut, bis daß die Nacht mit Ruh' und Stille kommt" – 9:32

2006 bonus track
 "OM Mani Padme Hum 4" (Piano Version) – 5:28

Personnel 
 Florian Fricke – piano, synclavier, vocals
 Daniel Fichelscher – guitar, percussion, vocals
 Renate Knaup – vocals

Guest musicians
 Kristen Ritter – vocals (on 1)
 Irmgard Hecker – vocals (on 7)
 Choir of the Bavarian State Opera

Synclavier programming, recording and digital mastering by Ralph Graf 
Track number 6 performed with the singing girls of the Zigi Cultural Troupe Ho, Ziavi

Credits 
Recorded at Union Studios, Munich, September 1987 
Track number 9 recorded at New African Studio, Munich and Sound Fabrik, Munich, January - April 1991 
Produced by Florian Fricke 
Track number 9 produced by Florian Fricke and Frank Fiedler

References

External links 
 
 Popol Vuh
 Comprehensive article & review of every album, in English
 featuring the original credits

Popol Vuh (band) soundtracks
1987 soundtrack albums
Drama film soundtracks